Simri Bakhtiyarpur is a subdivision and town in the Saharsa district of Bihar state, India.

There are 116 sub-villages and 15 wards(Nagar-Panchayat) in Simri Bakhtiyarpur.

Simri Bakhtiyarpur block headquarters is Simri Town, it belongs to Kosi Division and located about 20 km North from District headquarters Saharsa district.

Geography

The climate here is mild, and generally warm and temperate.

The average annual temperature in Simri Bakhtiyarpur is 25.2 °C,and receives annual rainfall of about 1100 mm.

Rivers
The Koshi River and its tributaries flood annually, affecting about 21,000 km2 (8,100 sq mi) of fertile agricultural lands and affecting the rural economy. This is the most devastating river of Bihar, earning it the epithet "Sorrow of Bihar".

Notable villages

Educational institutions
 +2 High School, Simri Bakhtiyarpur
 Hariwansh madhya Vidyalay 
 Quantum Central School
 The Green Planet School
 Kosi Public School
 Rose Valley Secondary School
 Nirmala Classes
 Holy Cross School
 Islamia High School
 International Public School
 Kidzee Simri Bakhtiyarpur
 Sunshine Academy
 Ambition Prestigious school
 D.C inter college
 Government Girls High School
 +2 High School
 Dhyanam Classes.(chandan sir)
 Indian Institute
 Government ITI college
 Chaudhary Mohammed Salahuddin P.V.T ITI college
 Indian Public School
 National Public School
 Top-20 Coaching
 Gayatri Siksha Niketan
 Rose Valley Secondary School-2
 St. Teresa Public School
 Doon Public School
 Colombus Public School
 Vivekanand Public School
 St. Xavier's School
 CMS World School
 Gyaansagar Coaching Institute
 Lucent Public School
 Red Rose Public School
 Primary School Ganga Prasad
 Challenger classes Ranginia
 Madarsa Haneefia Ranginia
 Integral Public school
 Madarsa Qasmia Darul Quran
 MADARSA ISLAHUL MUSLEMIN PAHLAM, PAHARPUR
 Madarsa Falahul Muslemein

Location
National Highway 107 passes through Simri-Bakhtiarpur.

Nearest Railway Station- Simri Bakhtiyarpur (SBV) Railway station which comes under Samastipur Railway Division, East Central Railway zone of Indian Railways.

Nearest Post Office-Simri Bakhtiyapur Post office (852127).

References

External links
 About Simri-Bakhtiarpur
 Satellite Map of Simri-Bakhtiarpur

Blocks in Saharsa district